Right to life is a phrase that describes the belief that a human being has an essential right to live.

Right to life may also refer to:

Right to Life Australia, an organisation that opposes abortion, euthanasia and stem cell research
Right to Life New Zealand, a Christchurch-based anti-abortion group
National Right to Life Committee, American anti-abortion organization
New York State Right to Life Party, a minor American political party